George Crowle (11 May 1696–1754), of Springhead, near Hull, Yorkshire was a British Whig politician who sat in the House of Commons from 1724 to 1747.

Early life 
Crowle was the eldest son of William Crowle, merchant of Hull, and his wife Dorothy Oates, daughter of Richard Oates of Pontefract. His father served as chamberlain of the borough of Hull in 1688 and 1689. His grandfather, Alderman George Crowle, was sheriff of Kingston upon Hull in 1657, and mayor in 1661 and 1679,  Crowle married his cousin Ellennor.

Career
Crowle stood for  Kingston upon Hull at the 1722 British general election but was unsuccessful. He was returned two years later as Member of Parliament for Hull at a fiercely contested by-election on 23 January 1724 and was returned again in a contest at the 1727 British general election. In Parliament he supported Walpole, who gave him a place  as Commissioner for Victualling the Navy in 1732. At the  1734 British general election he was returned again in a contest at Hull. He was appointed an extra Commissioner of the navy in 1738 and in 1740 as comptroller of storekeepers’ accounts for the navy instead, a post he retained until 1752. At the  1741 British general election he was returned unopposed at Hull.  By an act of 1742, his post became incompatible with a place in Parliament at the 1747 British general election so he vacated his seat and gave his interest  to the government candidate, Lord Robert Manners against his brother Richard. He was getting into debt and in 1752 he became a consul at Lisbon, probably to avoid his creditors. It was said he was ignorant of mercantile affairs and took sides with the Portuguese against Britain.

Death and legacy
Crowle died heavily in debt on 18 July 1754, leaving two sons and a daughter. His sister Elisabeth married Daniel Wilson, another MP.

References 

Members of the Parliament of Great Britain for English constituencies
Politicians from Kingston upon Hull
British MPs 1722–1727
British MPs 1727–1734
British MPs 1734–1741
British MPs 1741–1747
1696 births
1754 deaths